The Dinaric Alps, also Dinarides, are a mountain range in Southern and Southcentral Europe, separating the continental Balkan Peninsula from the Adriatic Sea. They stretch from Italy in the northwest through Slovenia, Croatia, Bosnia and Herzegovina, Serbia, Montenegro, and Kosovo to Albania in the southeast.

The Dinaric Alps extend for approximately  along the western Balkan Peninsula from the Julian Alps of the northeast Italy, downwards to the Šar and Korab massif, where their direction changes. The Accursed Mountains are the highest section of the entire Dinaric Alps; this section stretches from Albania to Kosovo and eastern Montenegro.

The Dinaric Alps are one of the most rugged and extensive mountainous areas of Europe, alongside the Caucasus Mountains, Alps, Pyrenees, Carpathian Mountains and Scandinavian Mountains. They are formed largely of Mesozoic and Cenozoic sedimentary rocks of dolomite, limestone, sandstone and conglomerates formed by seas and lakes that once covered the area. During the Alpine earth movements that occurred 50 to 100 million years ago, immense lateral pressures folded and overthrust the rocks in a great arc around the old rigid block of the northeast. The main tectonic phase of the orogenesis in the area of the Dinaric Karst took place in Cenozoic Era (Paleogene) as a result of the Adriatic Microplate (Adria) collision with Europe, and the process is still active. The Dinaric Alps were thrown up in more or less parallel ranges, stretching like necklaces from the Julian Alps as far as northern Albania and Kosovo, where the mountainous terrain subsides to make way for the waters of the Drin River and the plains of Kosovo.

Name
The Dinarides are named after Mount Dinara (1,831 m), a prominent peak in the center of the mountain range on the border with the Dalmatian part of Croatia and Bosnia and Herzegovina.

Geology

The Dinaric Karst region is built mostly of Mesozoic limestone and dolomite deposited on top of a huge Bahama-type carbonate platform, while a few kilometers thick carbonate successions have been deformed during the Alpine orogenesis. The main tectonic phase of the Alpine orogenesis in the Dinaric Karst region took place in the Cenozoic Era (Paleogene) as a result of the Adriatic microplate (Adria) collision with the Serbo-Macedonian and Rhodope Massifs, and the process is still active. The Mesozoic limestone forms a very distinctive region of the Balkans, notable for features such as the Karst Plateau, which has given its name to all such terrains of limestone eroded by groundwater. The Dinarides are known for being composed of karst – limestone rocks – as is Dinara, the mountain for which they were named. The Quaternary ice ages had relatively little direct geologic influence on the Balkans. No permanent ice caps existed, and there is little evidence of extensive glaciation. However, in the Accursed Mountains, a range on the northern Albanian border that runs east to west (thus breaking the general geographic trend of the Dinaric system), there is evidence of major glaciation. One geological feature of great importance to the present-day landscape of the Dinarides must be considered in more detail: that of the limestone mountains, often with their attendant faulting. They are hard and slow to erode, and often persist as steep jagged escarpments, through which steep-sided gorges and canyons are cleft by the rivers draining the higher slopes.

The partially submerged western Dinaric Alps form the numerous islands and harbors along the Croatian coast.

Rivers in Dinaric karst

The most extensive example of limestone mountains in Europe are those of the Karst of the Dinaric Alps. Here, all the characteristic features are encountered again and again as one travels through this wild and underpopulated country. Limestone is a very porous rock, yet very hard and resistant to erosion. Water is the most important corrosive force, dissolving the limestone by chemical action of its natural acidity. As it percolates down through cracks in the limestone it opens up fissures and channels, often of considerable depth, so that whole systems of underground drainage develop. During subsequent millennia these work deeper, leaving in their wake enormous waterless caverns, sinkholes and grottoes and forming underground labyrinths of channels and shafts. The roofs of some of these caverns may eventually fall in, to produce great perpendicular-sided gorges, exposing the surface to the water once more.

The Dinaric rivers carved many canyons characteristic for Dinaric Alps, and in particular karst. Among the largest and most well known are the Neretva, the Rakitnica, the Prača, the Drina, the Sutjeska, the Vrbas, the Ugar, the Piva, the Tara, the Komarnica, the Morača, the Cem/Ciijevna, the Lim, and the Drin.

Only along the Dinaric gorges is communication possible across the Karst, and roads and railways tunnel through precipitous cliffs and traverse narrow ledges above roaring torrents. A number of springs and rivers rise in the Dinaric range, including Jadro Spring noted for having been the source of water for Diocletian's Palace at Split. At the same time, the purity of these rocks is such that the rivers are crystal clear, and there is little soil-making residue. Water quality testing of the Jadro River, for example, indicates the low pollutant levels present. Rock faces are often bare of vegetation and glaring white, but what little soil there is may collect in the hollows and support lush lime-tolerant vegetation, or yield narrow strips of cultivation.

Human activity

Ruins of fortresses dot the mountainous landscape, evidence of centuries of war and the refuge the Dinaric Alps have provided to various armed forces. During the Roman period, the Dinarides provided shelter to the Illyrians resisting Roman conquest of the Balkans, which began with the conquest of the eastern Adriatic coast in the 3rd century BC. Rome conquered the whole of Illyria in 168 BC, but these mountains sheltered Illyrian resistance forces for many years until the area's complete subjugation by 14 AD. More recently, the Ottoman Empire failed to fully subjugate the mountainous areas of Montenegro. In the 20th century, too, the mountains provided favourable terrain for guerrilla warfare, with Yugoslav Partisans organising one of the most successful Allied resistance movements of World War II.

The area remains underpopulated, and forestry and mining remain the chief economic activities in the Dinaric Alps. The people of Bosnia and Herzegovina have the highest recorded average of any single country, with 183.9 cm average for men and 172.72 cm for women.

Mountain passes
The main mountain passes of the Dinaric Alps are:
 Postojna Gate (Postojnska vrata), Slovenia,
 Vratnik pass, Croatia
 Debelo brdo, Serbia
 Knin Gate (Kninska vrata), Croatia (about )
 Vaganj, Croatia/Bosnia-Herzegovina
 Ivan-Saddle (Ivan-sedlo), Bosnia-Herzegovina
 Kupres Gate (Kupreška vrata), Bosnia-Herzegovina
 Čemerno, Bosnia-Herzegovina
 Crkvine, Montenegro
 Čakor, Montenegro

Tunnels
Major tunnels transversing the Dinaric Alps include:
 Tuhobić Tunnel, Croatia
 Sveti Rok Tunnel, Croatia
 Mala Kapela Tunnel, Croatia

Mountains and plateaus

The mountains and plateaus within the Dinarides are found in the following regions:

Albania

Bosnia and Herzegovina

Croatia

Italy

Kosovo

Montenegro

Serbia

Slovenia

Notes

References

External links

 Discover Dinarides Project 
 Environment for People in the Dinaric Arc Project 
 Via Dinarica Trail - Mega-trail across highest peaks of Dinaric Alps

 
Mountain ranges of Albania
Mountain ranges of Bosnia and Herzegovina
Mountain ranges of Croatia
Mountain ranges of Kosovo
Mountain ranges of Serbia
Mountain ranges of Slovenia
Mountains of Bosnia and Herzegovina
Mountains of Montenegro
Physiographic provinces